Alan Sothern (born 28 July 1987) is an Irish field hockey player who plays as a forward for the Pembroke Wanderers.

He competed for the Ireland men's national field hockey team at the 2016 Summer Olympics.

Club career
Alan Sothern won two Irish Hockey League titles with Pembroke Wanderers in 2009 and 2010, before he went abroad to play for HC Den Bosch in the Netherlands. He left Den Bosch after one season to return to Pembroke Wanderers. He played for Racing Club de Bruxelles and Pembroke Wanderers again before joining La Gantoise in 2018.

References

External links
 
 
 

1987 births
Living people
Sportspeople from Dún Laoghaire–Rathdown
Irish male field hockey players
Male field hockey forwards
Olympic field hockey players of Ireland
Field hockey players at the 2016 Summer Olympics
2018 Men's Hockey World Cup players
Pembroke Wanderers Hockey Club players
HC Den Bosch players
Men's Irish Hockey League players
Ireland international men's field hockey players
Royal Racing Club Bruxelles players
Men's Belgian Hockey League players
Men's Hoofdklasse Hockey players